QPS may refer to:

Computing
 Quark Publishing System, a collaborative workflow management system
 Queries per second, a measure of high-load servers' performance

Organisations
 Queensland Police Service, Australia
 Quaker Peace and Service, former name of Quaker Peace and Social Witness, a UK Quakers organisation committee
 Quincy Public Schools, Massachusetts, US